Armando Peverelli (2 December 1921 – 18 July 1981) was an Italian racing cyclist. He rode in the 1949 Tour de France.

References

External links

1921 births
1981 deaths
Italian male cyclists
Cyclists from Milan